Søndeled is a former municipality in the old Aust-Agder county in Norway.  The  municipality existed from 1838 until its dissolution in 1964 when it was merged into the municipality of Risør in what is now Agder county. The municipality encompassed the land around the Søndeledfjorden. The administrative centre of Søndeled was the village of Søndeled at the innermost part of the Søndeledfjorden. Other villages in Søndeled included Stamsø, Akland, Moen, Bossvika, and Sivik. The main churches for Søndeled municipality were Indre Søndeled Church in the village of Søndeled and Ytre Søndeled Church in the east, just outside of the town of Risør.

History
The municipality of Østerrisør landdistrikt was created on 1 January 1838 (see formannskapsdistrikt law). It was called Østerrisør (East Risør) to distinguish itself from the municipality of Vesterrisør ("West Risør" in Mandal) and the neighboring town of Østerrisør. In 1865, the name was changed to Søndeled. On 1 January 1867, an uninhabited part of Søndeled was transferred to the neighboring municipality of Dybvaag. Later, on 1 January 1901, a small urban area of eastern Søndeled (population: 658) was transferred to the neighboring town of Risør.

During the 1960s, there were many municipal mergers across Norway due to the work of the Schei Committee. On 1 January 1964, the municipality of Søndeled (population: 3,134) was merged with the town of Risør (population: 3,002) to become the municipality of Risør.

Name
The municipality (originally the parish) is named after the local fjord (now called the Søndeledfjorden). The first element comes from the word sundene which means "straits" and the last element is led which means "path" or "way". Hence the name is the "path between the straits".

Government
The municipal council  of Søndeled was made up of 25 representatives that were elected to four year terms.  The party breakdown of the final municipal council was as follows:

See also
List of former municipalities of Norway

References

External links

Søndeled 

Risør
Former municipalities of Norway
1838 establishments in Norway
1964 disestablishments in Norway